"God of Our Fathers" is a 19th-century American Christian hymn, written in 1876 to commemorate the 100th anniversary of the United States Declaration of Independence.

The hymn was written by Daniel C. Roberts, a priest in the Protestant Episcopal Church serving, at the time, as rector of St. Thomas & Grace Episcopal churches in Brandon, Vermont. Roberts had served in the American Civil War in the 84th Ohio Infantry.

In 1892, Roberts sent the hymn anonymously to the General Convention of the Episcopal Church to be considered by a group tasked with revising the Episcopal hymnal. If the group accepted his hymn, Roberts said he would send them his name. The commission approved it. The hymnal editor and organist George W. Warren were to choose a hymn for the celebration of the Centennial of the United States Constitution. They chose Roberts' lyrics, which were originally sung to a tune called "Russian Hymn." Warren wrote a new tune called "National Hymn."

Lyrics

References

External links
God of Our Fathers in The Hymnal 1892
God of Our Fathers at Hymnary.org

American patriotic songs
American Christian hymns
National symbols of the United States
1876 songs
1876 in Christianity
19th-century hymns